Eleocharis microcarpa, common names small-fruited spikesedge, spike-rush, small-fruited spike-rush  and tiny-fruited spike-sedge,  is a plant in the Eleocharis genus found in North America.

Conservation status
It is listed as endangered in Indiana and Michigan. Eleocharis microcarpa var. filiculmis is a special concern and believed extirpated in Connecticut, and is listed as endangered in Massachusetts.

References

microcarpa
Flora of North America